Blockley Township is a defunct township that was located in Philadelphia County, Pennsylvania. Incorporated in 1704, the township was incorporated into the City of Philadelphia under the 1854 Act of Consolidation.

History
 

An irregularly shaped area of 7,580 acres (31 km²), Blockley Township was located on the west side of the Schuylkill River, north of Kingsessing Township; bounded on the east by the Schuylkill; extending south from the county line, opposite to, but a little below, the mouth of the Wissahickon, down to the Nanganesy or Mill Creek, below the Woodlands; then by the same creek up to Chadd’s Ford Turnpike, known in later years as the Baltimore Pike; along the same to Cobb’s Creek; then by the courses of the same to the county line adjoining Lower Merion Township, Montgomery County, and along the same to the Schuylkill River.

Within its boundaries were the villages of Hamilton, Mantua, West Philadelphia, Hestonville and Haddington. 

It was traversed by the Darby Road (today's Woodland Avenue) and Chadd’s Ford or Baltimore Pike, the road to West Chester, to Haverford and to Lancaster.

The name is derived from Blockley, a parish in England in Gloucestershire from which the township's founder, William Warner, hailed. In Philadelphia, "Blockley" was synonymous with the Blockley Almshouse that opened here in 1832. The township also contained The Woodlands; the former estate of William Hamilton, grandson of Andrew Hamilton, which was converted in 1840 to the Woodlands Cemetery.

The boundaries and area changed on February 17, 1844, when the area encompassing Mantua and Hamilton were incorporated into the Borough of West Philadelphia, dividing the remaining township into two almost unconnected sections.

The township was incorporated into Philadelphia proper by the 1854 Act of Consolidation.

References

Resources
Chronology of the Political Subdivisions of the County of Philadelphia, 1683-1854
Information courtesy of ushistory.org
Incorporated District, Boroughs, and Townships in the County of Philadelphia, 1854 By Rudolph J. Walther - excerpted from the book at the ushistory.org website

Municipalities in Philadelphia County prior to the Act of Consolidation, 1854
1854 disestablishments in Pennsylvania